1 Nicholson St., (formerly ICI House) is a 19-storey office building in Nicholson Street, East Melbourne, Victoria, Australia. Begun in 1955 to house the headquarters of the Australian subsidiary of Imperial Chemical Industries (since spun off as an independent public company and renamed Orica), it was the tallest building in Australia upon completion in 1958. It broke Melbourne's longstanding 132 ft height limit and was the first International Style skyscraper in the country. It symbolised progress, modernity, efficiency and corporate power in postwar Melbourne, and heralded the construction of the high-rise office buildings, changing the shape of Australia's major urban centres forever.

The building's design, by Osborn McCutcheon (of Bates Smart McCutcheon) was closely modelled on the best of corporate design being pioneered in the United States with all-glass high-rise such as the United Nations headquarters. Detail and documentation of the building's design was managed by Douglas Gardiner who was a partner of BSM.

The building made headlines soon after construction as panes of the coloured glass shattered and fell to the street below due to impurities and the heat of Melbourne's summers.

It is one of the few post-war office buildings to be found on the Victorian Heritage Register, and the first to be added.

References

Office buildings completed in 1958
Office buildings in Melbourne
Heritage-listed buildings in Melbourne
Australian National Heritage List
Modernist architecture in Australia
International Style (architecture)
East Melbourne, Victoria
Buildings and structures in the City of Melbourne (LGA)
1958 establishments in Australia